Joshua Jermaine Goodwin (born August 9, 1984) is an American retired basketball player. After three seasons playing collegiately for Lamar, he spent two years playing professionally in several countries.

College career
Goodwin played collegiately in the NCAA for Lamar Cardinals basketball playing 71 games and starting 20 overall, with averages of 5.8 points, 5.5 rebounds FGP:55.3%. His best year was as a senior, with averages of 6.9 points, 6.0 rebounds and led the team with 57.2% from the field. Set a career high scoring 31 points and 15rebs vs. Nicholls St. on March 1, 2006. Goodwin was a junior college transfer from Southwestern Christian College where he averaged 16.3 points, 8.9rebounds, and 2.0 blocks per game.

International career
After going undrafted in 2006, he signed a contract to play in Karlsruhe Germany for Union Shops Rastatt Basketball Bundesliga where he led the league in rebounds and averaged (11.3ppg, Reb-1(11.2rpg), 1.0spg). He also played in Sweden for Norrköping Dolphins where he averaged (10.5ppg, 2.5rpg, 1.0ast, 2FGP: 58.3%) in FIBA EuroCup Challenge. In 2007 he signed in New Zealand to play for the Manawatu Jets then finishing up in Dubai, and Bahrain playing for Nuwaidrat.

Sports management
In 2007 while playing professionally abroad he founded Higher Level Sports Agency as the CEO signing clients Darius Rice and Donald Little to lucrative contracts. In 2014 the company changed its name to Executive Sports Management. Since retirement he specializes in contract negotiations as a certified sports agent in the National Basketball Players Association.

Personal life
Goodwin is the son of the late Patrice Sias and Jessie Goodwin, and has a sister named Kayla Cole.

References

External links
Josh Goodwin at Proballers

American men's basketball players
Living people
Place of birth missing (living people)
Lamar Cardinals basketball players
American expatriate basketball people in Sweden
American expatriate basketball people in Germany
American expatriate basketball people in New Zealand
American expatriate basketball people in the United Arab Emirates
1983 births
Forwards (basketball)
Al-Jahra SC basketball players